Arthur Seymour was an English professional footballer who played as a goalkeeper.

Career
Born in South Shields, Seymour spent his early career with Hebburn Argyle and Barnsley. He signed for Bradford City in July 1903, making 34 league and 4 FA Cup appearances for the club, before being released in 1904. He played in Bradford City's first ever match, a 0–2 league defeat away at Grimsby Town on 1 September 1903.

Sources

References

Date of birth missing
Date of death missing
Footballers from South Shields
English footballers
Hebburn Argyle F.C. players
Barnsley F.C. players
Bradford City A.F.C. players
English Football League players
Association football goalkeepers